Saskia Ludwig (born 23 May 1968) is a German politician. 

Born in Potsdam, Brandenburg, she represents the Christian Democratic Union (CDU). She has served as a member of the Bundestag from the state of Brandenburg since 2019. She is a member of the Committee on European Union Affairs. She is also a member of the conservative Berliner Kreis, a sub-group of the Christian Democratic Union.

References

External links 

  
 Bundestag biography 

1968 births
Living people
Members of the Bundestag for Brandenburg
Female members of the Bundestag
21st-century German women politicians
Members of the Bundestag 2017–2021
Members of the Bundestag for the Christian Democratic Union of Germany